Bury EMU Depot was an Electric Traction Depot located in Bury, England. The depot was located on the west side of the line to the south of Bury railway station.

The depot code was BQ.

History 
Originally a steam facility known as Buckley Wells depot, it was closed between 1965 and 1973. By 1983, Class 504 EMUs had been allocated to the depot. The depot is now used by the East Lancashire Railway.

References

Bibliography

Railway depots in England
Rail transport in Greater Manchester